Cézembre Point is a rocky point  northeast of Cape Margerie. It was charted in 1950 by the French Antarctic Expedition and named for Cézembre, an island in the Golfe de Saint-Malo, France.

References 

Headlands of Adélie Land